Jamie Earl "James" Nieto (born November 2, 1976 in Seattle, Washington) is an American high jumper and actor.

His personal best jump is 2.34 (7' 8"), achieved at the 2004 Olympic Games in Athens.  He was the 2004 and 2012 USA Olympic Trials Champion as well as the 2003 USA Outdoor Champion with a jump of 2.30 meters (7' 6.5").

Nieto attended Eastern Michigan University, Sacramento City College, and Valley High School.

Nieto suffered a serious injury resulting in paralysis while doing a back flip in April 2016. In 2017, Nieto married Olympic hurdler Shevon Nieto, and in 2020, she sang an original song dedicated to Nieto on America's Got Talent.

Nieto played baseball hall of famer Roberto Clemente in a movie named Baseball's Last Hero: 21 Clemente Stories.

Achievements

References

External links 

 
 
 
 
 
 
 

1976 births
Living people
American male high jumpers
Olympic track and field athletes of the United States
Athletes (track and field) at the 2004 Summer Olympics
Athletes (track and field) at the 2012 Summer Olympics
Pan American Games medalists in athletics (track and field)
Pan American Games silver medalists for the United States
Athletes (track and field) at the 2003 Pan American Games
Athletes (track and field) at the 2007 Pan American Games
Athletes (track and field) at the 2011 Pan American Games
Eastern Michigan University alumni
Eastern Michigan Eagles men's track and field athletes
Track and field athletes from Seattle
Sportspeople from Chula Vista, California
Track and field athletes from California
USA Outdoor Track and Field Championships winners
Medalists at the 2003 Pan American Games